Eutetrapha terenia is an extinct species of beetle in the family Cerambycidae, that existed during the Middle Miocene in what is now China. It was described by Zhang J. F., Sun B. and Zhang X. in 1994.

References

Saperdini
Beetles described in 1994